Frenchman Flat is a hydrographic basin in the Nevada National Security Site south of Yucca Flat and north of Mercury, Nevada.  The flat was used as an American nuclear test site and has a  dry lake bed (Frenchman Lake) that was used as a 1950s airstrip before it was chosen after the start of the Korean War for the Nevada Proving Grounds. Nellis Air Force Base land  was transferred to the Atomic Energy Commission on which Site Mercury was constructed on the flat for supporting American nuclear explosive tests.  The 1951 Operation Ranger "Able" test (ground zero at UTM Coordinates 923758 on the flat) was the first continental US nuclear detonation after the 1945 Trinity test, and Frenchman Flat also had the only detonation of an American artillery-fired nuclear projectile in the 1953 Upshot-Knothole Grable test using the M65 Atomic Cannon.

Area 5
In the decade 1951–1962, 14 above ground nuclear tests were conducted at Frenchman Flat; several of these atmospheric tests were weapons effects tests. A relatively modest 8-kiloton blast in January 1951 broke storefront windows in Las Vegas.

Tests to determine building damage by nuclear blasts have left remains at the site that are of historical interest. Five underground nuclear weapons were detonated at Frenchman Flat between 1965 and 1968. A carbonate aquifer makes Area 5 not well suited to underground testing, so there were fewer detonations carried out.

Waste management

Mixed waste, including transuranic mixed waste, is stored.

Nonproliferation Test and Evaluation Complex

The Nonproliferation Test and Evaluation Complex (NPTEC), formerly called the Hazardous Material (HAZMAT) Spill Center, is located on Frenchman Flat in Area 5, a natural geological basin. It is the world's largest facility for open-air testing of hazardous materials and biological simulants. It includes a control building with data acquisition and recording instruments, a command and control computer, and support personnel. The test area has a tank farm, a wind tunnel, elevated stacks and spill pans, and storage tanks for the test chemicals. The facility houses both large-scale and small-scale hazardous materials testing and training. It provides a secure test-bed, calibrated release systems, weather data, ground truth instrumentation, and logistics in field verification and validation of technology.

Area 11
Four atmospheric plutonium-dispersal safety tests were conducted in the northern portion of Area 11 in 1954 and 1956. Hazardous residues from these tests continue to provide a realistic environment for safety training, radiological monitoring, sampling instruction and first-responder drills. Five underground nuclear weapons were detonated in Area 11 from 1966 to 1971.

See also
Pahute Mesa
Jackass Flats, Nevada
Nye County, Nevada

References

External links
 

Nevada Test Site
American nuclear weapons testing
American nuclear test sites
History of Nevada
Landmarks in Nevada
Nuclear weapons infrastructure of the United States
United States Department of Energy
Landforms of Nye County, Nevada
Nuclear test sites
Basins of Nevada